Ingvar Svensson may refer to:

 Ingvar Svensson (footballer) (born 1939), Swedish international footballer
 Ingvar Svensson (politician) (born 1944), Swedish politician

See also
 Svensson